Giles Glacier is a hanging glacier that flows eastward along the south side of Moyher Ridge to Thomas Glacier in the south Sentinel Range in the Ellsworth Mountains. It was named by the Advisory Committee on Antarctic Names in 2006 after J. David Giles, Polar Ice Coring Office, University of Nebraska, who supported United States Antarctic Program drilling operations at Taylor Dome, the South Pole, Windless Bight, Siple Dome and Kamb Ice Stream, from 1993 to 1998.

See also
 List of glaciers in the Antarctic
 Glaciology

References
 

Glaciers of Ellsworth Land